The Split Open is a professional tennis tournament played on outdoor clay courts. It is currently part of the ATP Challenger Tour. It is held annually in Split, Croatia since 2020.

Past finals

Singles

Doubles

References

ATP Challenger Tour
Clay court tennis tournaments
Tennis tournaments in Croatia
Split, Croatia
Recurring sporting events established in 2020
Split Open
Sport in Split, Croatia